The Justice Party held a leadership election between 8 and 13 July 2019. It was an election to elect a new leader as Lee Jeong-mi fulfilled her two-year term of office.

Candidates

Running 
 Sim Sang-jung, member of the National Assembly for Goyang, former leader of the party (2015- 2017)
 Yang Kyung-gyu, former deputy secretary of the Korean Confederation of Trade Unions

Campaigns 
The leadership election has received media attention due to the presence of Sim Sang-jung, a presidential candidate in the 2017 South Korean presidential election and the former leader of the party, on the ballot. Yang, hailing from the party's left-wing faction, calls for a "bold, democratic socialist transformation" of the Korean society. The candidates have engaged in a series of debates that were broadcast on KBS and MBC.

Results 
Only dues-paying party members could vote in the election. The voting was held from 8 to 13 July 2019.

References 

Justice Party (South Korea)
Justice
Justice